Petra Haltmayr (born 16 September 1975 in Rettenberg) is a German former alpine skier who competed in the 2002 Winter Olympics and 2006 Winter Olympics.

External links
 sports-reference.com

1975 births
Living people
People from Oberallgäu
Sportspeople from Swabia (Bavaria)
Olympic alpine skiers of Germany
Alpine skiers at the 2002 Winter Olympics
Alpine skiers at the 2006 Winter Olympics
German female alpine skiers